Goshenville is an unincorporated community in East Goshen Township in Chester County, Pennsylvania, United States. Goshenville is located at the intersection of Pennsylvania Route 352 and Paoli Pike.

See also
Goshenville Historic District

References

Unincorporated communities in Chester County, Pennsylvania
Unincorporated communities in Pennsylvania